The Hilpulyan are an Adivasi group in Kerala, India.  They have the lowest education level, the most unsanitary living-conditions and generally the lowest income level of any Adivasi group in Idukki District.  Most work as manual laborers on the farms of others and supplement their food and other resources by gathering in the forests.

Sources
Article on Adivasi in Idukki district

Ethnic groups in India
Social groups of Kerala
Scheduled Tribes of Kerala